OCAD University, an art and design post-secondary university in Toronto, holds an association with a number of individuals, including alumni, faculty, and staff.

Alumni
 Madeline Ashby — science fiction writer
 Myfanwy Ashmore – conceptual artist
 Barbara Astman – artist, photographer
 Yank Azman – actor
 Rebecca Belmore – artist
 David Blackwood – artist
 Shary Boyle – sculpture, painting, drawing, performance
 Jubal Brown – video artist
 Nina Bunjevac – cartoonist
 George Bures Miller – installation artist
 Jack Bush – abstract expressionist painter, member of the Painters Eleven
 Meryn Cadell – writer, performance artist
 Franklin Carmichael – painter, member of the Group of Seven
 Robin Cass – filmmaker, producer
 Aimee Chan – graphic designer, Miss Hong Kong 2006, actress
 Candy Chang - former actress, multiple pageant winner
 Holly Coulis – artist, painter
 Greta Dale – muralist
 Cathy Daley – artist, educator
 Ken Danby – artist, painter
 Jan Derbyshire – comedian, playwright
 Bonnie Devine – artist
 George Dunning – artist, illustrator
 Wallace Edwards – illustrator
 Frank Faubert – politician, final Mayor of Scarborough
 Ed Furness – comic book artist
 Gregory Gallant – comic book artist, writer
 Max Gimblett – artist
 Katherine Gray – artist
 Emanuel Hahn – sculptor, coin designer
 Rachel Hayward – actress
 Wade Hemsworth – songwriter
 Dorothy Henriques-Wells – painter
 April Hickox – photographer, artist, academic
 Peter Ho – singer, producer, actor, model
 Cleeve Horne – painter, sculptor
 James Archibald Houston – artist, children's author
 Barbara Howard – artist, wood engraver
 Eli Ilan – sculptor
 Michael Ironside – actor, director
 Clark Johnson – actor, director
 Tracey Johnston-Aldworth – entrepreneur, environmentalist
 Carlos del Junco – musician
 Garry Kennedy – conceptual artist
 Arounna Khounnoraj – artist, teacher, and author
 Brian Kipping – artist, musician
 Maya Kulenovic – painter
 William Kurelek – artist, writer
 Monte Kwinter – politician
 Martha Ladly – designer, musician
 Artis Lane – sculptor, painter
 Robert Lougheed – artist
 Irene Loughlin – performance artist, writer
 Wayne Lum – sculptor, commercial artist
 Charmaine Lurch – artist, educator
 Mary Florence MacDonald, curator
 Duncan Macpherson – cartoonist
 Michael Martchenko – illustrator
 Jean Mathieson – animator
 Bruce Mau – designer, writer
 Sanaz Mazinani – artist
 Doris McCarthy – landscape artist
 Manly E. MacDonald – artist
 Christine McGlade - digital designer, television producer 
 Ross McLaren – artist, filmmaker
 Claire Mowat – writer
 Will Munro – artist
 Walter Tandy Murch – painter
 Shelley Niro – painter, installation artist, filmmaker
 Mary Margaret O'Hara – musician, actress
 Lucille Oille – sculptor, illustrator
 Kim Ondaatje – painter, photographer, filmmaker
 Edie Parker – sculptor
 Harley Parker – painter
 Lee Patterson – actor
 Kelly Richardson – video artist, photographer
 William Ronald – painter, founder of the Painters Eleven
 Karl Schroeder – science fiction writer
 Floria Sigismondi – photographer, director
 Anne Simpson – poet, novelist
 Michael Snow – installation artist, filmmaker
 Rudolf Stussi – painter
 Angela Su – artist
 Rick Switzer – sculptor
 Paul Szep – cartoonist
 Gary Taxali – artist, illustrator
 Rirkrit Tiravanija – installation artist
 Camille Turner – performance artist
 Maurice Vellekoop – artist, illustrator
 Lea Vivot – sculptor
 Jan Wade - artist
 George A. Walker – book artist
 Simon Wilcox – musician
 Richard Williams – animator
 Dick Wilson – actor
 Elizabeth Wyn Wood – sculptor
 Jaret Vadera – artist
 Noreen Young – producer, puppeteer

Faculty
Faculty and staff of OCAD University and its predecessors have included
 Roy Ascott
 Barbara Astman
 Aba Bayefsky
 Bill Buxton
 Nicole Collins
 William Cruikshank
 Carl Dair
 Cathy Daley
 Bonnie Devine
 Allan Fleming
 Richard Fung
 Ian Carr-Harris
 Robert Harris
 Johanna Householder
 Burton Kramer
 Martha Ladly
 Min Sook Lee
 Arthur Lismer
 J. E. H. MacDonald
 Jock Macdonald
 Thomas Mower Martin
 Ashok Mathur
 Christine McGlade
 Christiane Pflug
 George Agnew Reid
 Lisa Steele
 Maurice Vellekoop
 George A. Walker
 Norman White
 Muriel Wood

Chancellors
Rosalie Sharp (2004-2007)
James K. Bartleman (2007-2010)
Catherine Delaney (2010-2017)
Salah Bachir (2017-2021)
Jamie Watt (2022–present)

Administration

Principals
George Agnew Reid (1912-1928)
J. E. H. MacDonald (1928-1932)
Fred S. Haines (1932-1951)
Lawrence A. C. Panton (1951-1954)
Sydney Hollinger Watson (1955-1970)

Presidents 
Roy Ascott (1971-1972)
Clifford Pitt (1972-1975)
Paul Duncan Fleck (1975-1982)
Norman Blasdell Hathaway (1983-1987)
Timothy Porteous (1988-1995)
Alan Barkley (1995-1998)
Catherine Henderson (1998-2000)
Ron Shuebrook (2000-2005)
Sara Diamond (2005-2020)
Ana Serrano (2020–present)

References

OCAD University